Regions Center is a 30-story skyscraper located at 400 West Capitol Avenue in downtown Little Rock, Arkansas. At 454 feet (138 m) high, it is currently the second tallest building in Arkansas. It was completed in 1975.

References

Regions Financial Corporation
Skyscraper office buildings in Little Rock, Arkansas
Office buildings completed in 1975